Major General Roland de Vries  was a South African Army officer. He served as Deputy Chief of the South African Army before his retirement in 1999.

Early life

Military career 
Roland de Vries joined the South African Army in January 1963, qualified as an officer in April 1964 and retired as the Deputy Chief of the South African Army in April 1999. He served in various training and operational positions.

Command
He commanded amongst others,  61 Mechanised Battalion Group, the South African Army College, 7 South African Infantry Division and the Joint Training Division of the South African National Defence Force (SANDF).

Operations
His operational experience included various military operations in the former Rhodesia, South West Africa (Namibia) and Southern Angola. Some of these were Operation Protea (1981), Moduler (1987) and Prone (1988) in Southern Angola. The latter two mentioned high intensity conventional battles subsequently led to the peace accord being signed between South Africa, Angola and the Cubans in New York on 22 December 1988.

Ratel Programme
He was a major contributor to the development of the Ratel IFV infantry fighting vehicle and its subsequent combat system and doctrine during the seventies.

His book on mobile warfare, Mobile Warfare – a perspective for Southern Africa, was published during August 1987 in South Africa, while he was a colonel. This book outlined his thinking on the development of operational concepts and military doctrine for mobile conventional warfare within the Southern African context. He is credited with being the main driver behind these concepts within the South African Army.

With the SANDF
Gen de Vries led the Transformation Team of the newly created South African National Defence Force (SANDF) in 1997 in developing a new integrated Leadership, Command and Management Concept for the Department of Defence.

In 1997 he was appointed Chief of Joint Training and in 1998 as Deputy Chief of the SA Army. This role entailed developing a new military strategy for the SA Army as well as planning and managing the army's transformation process.

He retired as the Deputy Chief of the South African Army in April 1999.

Life outside the military
Gen de Vries is married to Henriette and they have four children Roland (Jnr), Elmarie, Melanie and Pieter.

He currently manages his own business, but remains engaged in advisory support for corporate security services and the transformation initiatives of armies in Africa. His memoirs, entitled Eye of the Firestorm, was published in May 2013.

Awards and decorations 
General de Vries was awarded the following:

References

Further reading 
 
 
 
 

South African Army generals
Living people
Year of birth missing (living people)
South African military personnel of the Border War